Ulundi Stadium is a multi-use stadium in Ulundi, KwaZulu-Natal, South Africa. It is currently used mostly for football matches and is the alternate home venue of AmaZulu.

Sports venues in KwaZulu-Natal
Soccer venues in South Africa